Westminster-Dewdney was a provincial electoral district in the Canadian province of British Columbia from 1894 to 1898.  It and its sister ridings Westminster-Delta, Westminster-Chilliwhack and Westminster-Richmond were successors to the old four-member Westminster riding, which appeared in 1890 only and was a subdivision of the older New Westminster riding.  Westminster-Dewdney was succeeded by the Dewdney riding in the election of 1903.  This area is currently part of the Maple Ridge-Mission riding, with its former eastern portions now in Chilliwack-Kent (Dewdney had included Agassiz and Harrison Hot Springs in its first incarnation).

Electoral history 

|- bgcolor="white"
!align="right" colspan=3|Total valid votes
!align="right"|551
!align="right"|100.00%
!align="right"|
|- bgcolor="white"
!align="right" colspan=3|Total rejected ballots
!align="right"|
!align="right"|
!align="right"|
|- bgcolor="white"
!align="right" colspan=3|Turnout
!align="right"|%
!align="right"|
!align="right"|
|}

|- bgcolor="white"
!align="right" colspan=3|Total valid votes
!align="right"|455
!align="right"|100.00%
!align="right"|
|- bgcolor="white"
!align="right" colspan=3|Total rejected ballots
!align="right"|
!align="right"|
!align="right"|
|- bgcolor="white"
!align="right" colspan=3|Turnout
!align="right"|%
!align="right"|
!align="right"|
|- bgcolor="white"
!align="right" colspan=7|1 16th Premier of British Columbia
|}

|- bgcolor="white"
!align="right" colspan=3|Total valid votes
!align="right"|623
!align="right"|100.00%
!align="right"|
|- bgcolor="white"
!align="right" colspan=3|Total rejected ballots
!align="right"|
!align="right"|
!align="right"|
|- bgcolor="white"
!align="right" colspan=3|Turnout
!align="right"|%
!align="right"|
!align="right"|
|}

In the large redistribution in advance of the 1903 election, which provided the basis for the modern system of ridings until the 1990s, the Westminster-Dewdney riding was adjusted slightly and renamed Dewdney, which lasted until the general election of 1986.

References 
Elections BC historical returns

Former provincial electoral districts of British Columbia